Sparganothis tessellata is a species of moth   of the family Tortricidae. It is found in the United States in Alabama, Florida, Georgia and Mississippi.

The wingspan is 10–11 mm.

References

Moths described in 2012
Sparganothis